"Western Stars" is a song by Bruce Springsteen, the title track of his 2019 album. It was the fourth and last single released from the album, also having a physical limited edition release with "The Wayfarer" as the B-side, and charted at No. 87 in Ireland, at No. 4 in Portugal and at No. 41 on the Billboard Hot Rock & Alternative Songs chart.

History
This ballad is a character study about an aging Hollywood actor whose career has long faded. His biggest claim to fame was that he was once shot in a Western by John Wayne. The actor still gets free drinks as a result of that moment of glory.
The video was directed by Thom Zinny, who also shot Springsteen's clip for "Tucson Train", and show The Boss in various settings, including a blue-collar bar where he performs the song.

References

2019 singles
2019 songs
Bruce Springsteen songs
Songs written by Bruce Springsteen
Song recordings produced by Ron Aniello